Pupisoma is a genus of minute, air-breathing land snails, terrestrial pulmonate gastropod molluscs or micromollusks in the family Valloniidae. 

Pupisoma is placed within Valloniidae because Pupisomatidae is considered to be a synonym of Valloniidae.

Species
Species within the genus Pupisoma include:

 Pupisoma bailyi Pilsbry, 1934
 Pupisoma cacharicum Godwin-Austen, 1910
 Pupisoma circumlitum Hedley, 1897
 Pupisoma comicolense H. B. Baker, 1928 
 Pupisoma costulata Hausdorf, 2007
 Pupisoma dioscoricola (C. B. Adams, 1845)
 † Pupisoma distans Falkner, 1974 
 Pupisoma evada (Iredale, 1944)
 Pupisoma evezardi (Hanley & Theobald, 1874)
 Pupisoma gracile Haas, 1937
 Pupisoma hueense (Wattebled, 1886)
 Pupisoma japonicum Pilsbry, 1902
 Pupisoma lignicola (Stoliczka, 1871)
 Pupisoma longstaffae Godwin-Austen, 1910
 Pupisoma macneilli (Clapp, 1918)
 Pupisoma mauritiana W. Adam, 1954
 Pupisoma mediamericanum Pilsbry, 1920
 Pupisoma miccyla (Benson, 1860)
 Pupisoma microturbinata Stanisic, 2010
 Pupisoma misaliensis Gittenberger & van Bruggen, 2013
 Pupisoma moleculina (van Benthem Jutting, 1940)
 Pupisoma orcella (Stoliczka, 1873)
 Pupisoma pagodula Stanisic, 2010
 Pupisoma paroense E. Gittenberger & Leda, 2021
 Pupisoma perpusillum (Möllendorff, 1897)
 Pupisoma porti (Brazier, 1876)
 Pupisoma pulvisculum (Issel, 1874)
 Pupisoma renschi K. L. Pfeiffer, 1952
 Pupisoma solemi (Maassen, 2000)
 Pupisoma umbilicata B. Rensch, 1935
 Pupisoma vermeuleni (Maassen, 2000)
 Pupisoma vimontianum (Crosse, 1874)
 Pupisoma waterloti Fischer-Piette, Blanc, F. & Vukadinovic, 1974
 Pupisoma sp. nov. 1 from Nicaragua

Synonyms
 Pupisoma atens Hylton Scott, 1960: synonym of Pupisoma comicolense H. B. Baker, 1927 (junior synonym)
 Pupisoma bilamellatum van Benthem Jutting, 1958: synonym of Acmella bilamellata (van Benthem Jutting, 1958) (original combination)
 Pupisoma chytrophora (Mabille, 1887): synonym of Tonkinospira chytrophora (Mabille, 1887)
 Pupisoma constrictum (Godwin-Austen, 1895): synonym of Moderata constricta (Godwin-Austen, 1895) (unaccepted combination)
 Pupisoma evezerdi (Hanley & Theobald, 1874): synonym of Pupisoma evezardi (Hanley & Theobald, 1874) (incorrect subsequent spelling)
 Pupisoma galapagorum Pilsbry, 1934: synonym of Pupisoma comicolense H. B. Baker, 1927 (junior synonym)
 Pupisoma harpula (Reinhardt, 1886): synonym of Salpingoma harpula (Reinhardt, 1886)
 Pupisoma insigne Pilsbry, 1920: synonym of Pupisoma dioscoricola insigne Pilsbry, 1920 (unaccepted combination)
 Pupisoma longstaffi Godwin-Austen, 1910: synonym of Pupisoma longstaffae Godwin-Austen, 1910 (incorrect original spelling)
 Pupisoma michoacanensis Pilsbry, 1920: synonym of Pupisoma mediamericanum Pilsbry, 1920 (junior synonym)
 Pupisoma minus Pilsbry, 1920: synonym of Pupisoma macneilli (G. H. Clapp, 1918) (junior synonym)
 Pupisoma orcula (Benson, 1850): synonym of Pupisoma dioscoricola (C. B. Adams, 1845) (junior synonym)
 Pupisoma philippinicum Möllendorff, 1888: synonym of Pupisoma orcula (Benson, 1850): synonym of Pupisoma dioscoricola (C. B. Adams, 1845) (junior synonym)
 Pupisoma seriola (Benson, 1861): synonym of Pupilla seriola (Benson, 1861)
 Pupisoma steudneri (Jickeli, 1874): synonym of Sitala steudneri (Jickeli, 1874) (superseded combination)
 Pupisoma unilamellatum van Benthem Jutting, 1958: synonym of Acmella unilamellata (van Benthem Jutting, 1958) (original combination)

References 

 Habe, T. (1956). Anatomical Studies on the Japanese Land Snails (7). Venus (Japanese Journal of Malacology). 19(2): 109–117.
 Hausdorf B. (2007). "Revision of the American Pupisoma species (Gastropoda: Pupilloidea)". Journal of Natural History 41(21–24): 1481–1511. .

External links
 Stoliczka, F. (1873). On the land-shells of Penang island, with descriptions of the animals and anatomical notes; part second, Helicacea. The Journal of the Asiatic Society of Bengal, Part II, 42 (1): 11-38, pl. 1-3. Calcutta
 Iredale, T. (1937). A basic list of the land Mollusca of Australia. The Australian Zoologist. 8(4): 287-333
 Pilsbry, H. A. (1889). Nomenclature and check-list of North American land shells. Proceedings of the Academy of Natural Sciences of Philadelphia. 41: 191–210
 Godwin-Austen, H. H. (1882-1920). Land and freshwater Mollusca of India, including South Arabia, Baluchistan, Afghanistan, Kashmir, Nepal, Burmah, Pegu, Tenasserim, Malay Peninsula, Ceylon, and other islands of the Indian Ocean. Supplementary to Messrs. Theobald and Hanley's Conchologia Indica. London, Taylor & Francis. Vol. 1(1): i-iv, 1-18, pls 1-4 

 
Gastropod genera
Taxa described in 1873